Lindlar is a municipality in the Oberbergischer Kreis, in North Rhine-Westphalia, Germany. It is located about 30 km east of Cologne.

Geography
Lindlar is located between latitudes 50°58' and 51°5' N. and longitudes 7°15' and 7°28' E. The highest point at 361.8 ms is found near Oberlichtinghagen, the lowest at 110 ms near Oberbilstein.

Neighbouring places
Neighbouring towns are Gummersbach, Wipperfürth, Overath and Bergisch Gladbach, and the neighbouring municipalities are Engelskirchen, Marienheide and Kürten.

Division of the municipality

The municipality of Lindlar is made up of these main villages: Lindlar (local centre), Frielingsdorf, Linde, Hohkeppel, Schmitzhöhe, Hartegasse/Kapellensüng.

The coat of arms of Lindlar
The arms were granted on 6 August 1935. The arms show in the upper part the lion of the Counts of Berg and in the lower the balance as a symbol of justice. Lindlar had its own court in the County Berg. The arms are based on the old seal of the court and village of Lindlar.

Twin town
Lindlar is twinned with Shaftesbury Dorset England, and Kaštela in Croatia.

History

Settlement and first naming
It is likely that the area around Lindlar was settled in the stone age. While there is no ultimate proof for that, neolithic artifacts were found near Kemmerich and Fenke. Until the Middle Ages the area was covered with virgin forests; it can therefore be assumed that only few people, such as hunters, settled there.
The eldest available records mentioning Lindlar -then known as Lintlo- date back to the year 1109. But as an older document from the year 958 cites the transferral of the Kaldenkapellen -now Hohkeppel- church to the Severinsstift in Cologne and as the former was then provably subordinated to the parish church in Lindlar, this church must have already existed in that year or even up to a few decades earlier.

Till 1815
The tower of the parish church of Lindlar was built in the 12th century and remains till today, although the tower's roof was built in the 18th century. A nave was lustrated in the year of 1500, and the present nave was built in 1826. The village of Lindlar was centred around the church.

In the course of time more and more woods were stubed, both by the farmers and on order of the landlords. Centers of the expansion were the so-called "Fronhöfe" and the "Herrenhöfe". Here the farmers had to pay their tenth and the work of courts and administration were done.

The "Bergische Land" was divided in departments and circuits. The area around Lindlar, including Wipperfeld, Bechen, Kürten, Olpe, Lindlar, Overath, Engelskirchen, Hohkeppel and Wipperfürth formed the department of Steinbach. Steinbach is a small village next to Lindlar and was named after the castle of Steinbach.

In this time a county court was set up in Lindlar. In 1440 Hohkeppel and in 1554 Engelskirchen had their own parish churches.

In 1806 Napoleon bestowed upon the county of Berg the honour of being a grand duchy. The county court in Lindlar remained, but was renamed in "Friedensgericht". Furthermore, the "canton Lindlar" was formed.

1815–1870
After 1815 the whole Rhineland became part of Preußen and the "district Wipperfürth" was set up. In 1828 the population of Lindlar was 5430, 5396 were Catholic and only 34 Protestants.

1871–1918
In 1882 an auxiliary fire brigade in Lindlar was arranged. A new building for the county court in Lindlar had to be built in 1895. In 1897 the municipal council first reflected upon the idea of a railway connection to Lindlar. The idea was to build a connection to Immekeppel where a train to Cologne departed and arrived. In 1906 this was allowed by the government and the railway Cologne – Bergisch Gladbach – Immekeppel – Lindlar was opened in 1912. There were several elementary schools in Lindlar: in the town of Lindlar, Linde, Waldbruch, Süng, Frielingsdorf, Hohkeppel, Schmitzhöhe and Kalkofen. Since the priest Johannes Fischer and the carpenter Christian MIebach gave their legacy for a new hospital, a hospital was built in Lindlar and opened in 1891.
In 1904 a new townhall was built.

1919–1932

Population of Lindlar

Localities

Culture

Church municipalities
Up to the Second World War Lindlar was predominantly a Catholic, Protestant inhabitant had to be established on account of the increased number in 1956 a Protestant church. In addition, at the beginning 1990s a Protestant free church and a neuapastolische church settled.
Now thus there is in Lindlar:
 6 Catholic churches in Lindlar, Frielingsdorf, Kapellensüng, Linde, Schmitzhöhe and Hohkeppel
 2 Protestant churches in Lindlar and Frielingsdorf
 a Protestant free church in Lindlar
 a New Apostolic Church in Lindlar

Cultural facilities
Lindlar disposes of a great cultural centre (more than 800 places) in the regularly theatrical arrangement and music arrangements take place. Smaller arrangements help themselves of the council hall " old school " in Eichenhofstrasse.

The municipality library Lindlar houses a great choice of books and is helped financially by a conveyor association, so that the lending is free  so far.

Markets
Regularly flea markets, art craftsman markets, farm markets take place in the Bergischen open-air museum as well as a Christmas fair. As a specific feature an old-timer market takes place in Lindlar - Schmitzhöhe.

Museums
From the place lies there not far the Bergische open-air museum Lindlar, it is accessible about the RB25 and the bus line 331 or the SB40 from Cologne or Lindlar. Besides, in Lindlar-Altenrath there is a curiosity museum.

Places of interest
The municipality marks itself "tourism municipality" (resort and leisure place). The historical local cores of Lindlar, Hohkeppel and Linde are worth seeing. In addition, one sees with the walking on the extensive footpath net often one of the road crosses and also many smaller chapels.

Castles
In the local area lie the castle ruins "Ruine Eibach", "Neuenberg" and "Unterheiligenhoven", as well as this "castle Heiligenhoven " and the "castle Georghausen ".

Churches
The Catholic parish church "Sankt Severin" was built in the 12th century. There are old Catholic churches in Hohkeppel and Linde. The Protestant church in Lindlar was built from 1954–56.

Museums
The "Bergische Freilichtmuseum Lindlar" (an open-air museum about agriculture in the "Bergisches Land") and a "Kuriositätenmuseum" (a museum about oddities) are located in Lindlar.

Buildings and monuments
Lindlar, Marketplace
 Altes Amtshaus: In the 18th century a peace-treaty between France and Austria was signed in this building.
 Haus Prinz: a timbered house  build in 1750.
Lindlar, Ort
 Schmiede Lamsfuß (a blacksmith's shop), Hauptstraße, build in the 18th century, 1986 restored.
 Amtsgericht Lindlar, Pollerhofstraße: the building of the former country court of lindlar.
 Alte Winterschule, Pollerhofstraße: an old school for farmer's children ("winter-school"). Today the building hosts a cosy and culturally attractive hotel-restaurant "artgenossen".
 Haus Kelleter, Bachstraße.
 Haus der Begegnung, the former townhall.
 Haus Gronewald
 catholic rectory
 Ratssaal "Alte Schule".

monuments in Lindlar
 war memorial, Eichenhofstraße, 1877
 Lindlar's "Besemsbänger", Eichenhofstraße, memorial made of wood. A "Besemsbänger" is a person who binds besoms.
 A Quarryman's family, Marketplace.

Churches in Lindlar
 Catholic parish church St. Severin
 Protestant church

Schools and educational facilities
In Lindlar are six elementary schools in different villages: Frielingsdorf, Kapellensüng, Linde, Schmitzhöhe, Lindlar west and the Lindlar east. As grammar schools a secondary modern school, a secondary modern  school, a high school as well as a special school exist for LB- and E-pupil. Secondary modern school  are accommodated in a school center and not far of it the high school founded in 1997. The next work pedagogic equipment is in Wipperfürth. In Lindlar there is also a branch of VHS.

Public facilities
 Youth office satellite station Lindlar
 Lindlar Touristik
 District agency of the police inspection the north District - district police authority of the Oberbergischer Kreis
 Voluntary fire department with four units fire brigade Lindlar, fire brigade Frielingsdorf, fire-fighting team Hohkeppel, fire-fighting team Remshagen

Health service
Heart Jesus's hospital Lindlar (151 beds with anesthesia, geriatrics, internal medicine, ENT, urology with connected doctor's house. Since 1999 cooperation with the Saint Josef hospital  in Engelskirchen  form of the Catholic Kliniken Oberberg GmbH.

Spare time and sport
Lindlar has, as one of few municipalities, its own leisure park. It was established between 1980 and 1982. There are a swimming pool (Parkbad Lindlar), a crazy golf layout, a concert space, an adventure game space, boot rental company as well as several investments is found for sport. The leisure park directly borders on the castle park of the Castle Heiligenhoven and on the Lindlarer cultural centre.

The municipality has more than seven sports fields, a stadium with field as well as one with Aschenplatz, seven gymnasiums, under it two big triple run halls and a gymnastics hall and two tennis courts. Also, there is an indoor swimming pool, including sauna, fitness and sunbathing area and sports field, a sail airfield, riding spaces, a golf layout, a shooting gallery and skittle-alleys.

In Lindlar there are a lot of footpaths and the streets have separate cycle lanes. Cyclists use, mainly, the forestry and countryside tracks.

Lindlar and its villages have a large number of associations which are well established. Most important are the protection associations, sports associations and native country associations.

Economy, industry and infrastructure
From the 16th to the 19th century the iron industry was in the environment of Lindlar, and stood economically in high blossom. Numerous iron hammer and furnaces were run there whose remaining stocks are to be found today partially still. by the way, the agriculture and the down-to-earth craft, for instance, the stone industry (reduction and processing of the greywacke), paper processing, home industry and file cutting was maintained. In addition, in the beginning of the 1980s a settlement of company took place in the new industrial zone of Klause.

Lindlarer greywacke
For more than 400 years it is diminished in Lindlar greywacke. If this industry fork still hundred years ago was a main employer of the Lindlarer population, today only three producing companies exist. In many places former stone quarries which are today an important living space for all sorts of animal species are found. The Lindlarer greywacke was used on site to the construction, examples for this are the steeple of the Catholic parish church Saint Severin. Also it was sold in the other environment, for instance, to Cologne. In this connection the Lindlarer railroad which transported the rock till the 1960s by railway is worth mentioning. For this target led from the main reduction area - a brake road.

Road network and public transport

Highway
Lindlar about the federal motorway A4 (Cologne Olpe) is linked up to the highway net. At the best  to use the motorway at  exit Engelskirchen (in 7 kilometers of distance) or Overath-Untereschbach (15 kilometers).

Railroad
The next railway station is in Engelskirchen, Lindlar itself is not connected to railroads anymore. On the railroad line Lindlar - Linde - Hoffnungsthal - Cologne a private train was operated until October 1960. Freight transport followed on 23 May 1966. In 2005 the rails were dismantled as much as possible.

Bus connections and railroad connections
Lindlar lies very traffic-favorable with the A4 (exit Untereschbach or Engelskirchen). Also public transport is developed according to line very well.

Literature

German
 Wilhelm Breidenbach: Beiträge zur Heimatgeschichte der Gemeinde Lindlar, hg. v. Josef Gronewald, Lindlar 1977
 Richard Fabritius: Lindlar - eine Gemeinde im "Dritten Reich" 1933-1945, Zeitgeschichtliche Dokumentation, Band 2, Lindlar 1995
 Josef Külheim: Lindlar, Wuppertal 1955* Gerd Müller: Lindlar - eine Bergische Gemeinde erzählt..., Lindlar 1976
 Geschichte macht Schule. Lindlarer (Schul-) Geschichte vom 19. Jahrhundert bis heute, Lindlar 1990

References

External links
 Internet page of the municipality Lindlar 

Towns in North Rhine-Westphalia
Oberbergischer Kreis
Districts of the Rhine Province